Transcription initiation factor TFIID subunit 5 is a protein that in humans is encoded by the TAF5 gene.

Function 

Initiation of transcription by RNA polymerase II requires the activities of more than 70 polypeptides. The protein that coordinates these activities is transcription factor IID (TFIID), which binds to the core promoter to position the polymerase properly, serves as the scaffold for assembly of the remainder of the transcription complex, and acts as a channel for regulatory signals. TFIID is composed of the TATA-binding protein (TBP) and a group of evolutionarily conserved proteins known as TBP-associated factors or TAFs. TAFs may participate in basal transcription, serve as coactivators, function in promoter recognition or modify general transcription factors (GTFs) to facilitate complex assembly and transcription initiation. This gene encodes an integral subunit of TFIID associated with all transcriptionally competent forms of that complex. This subunit interacts strongly with two TFIID subunits that show similarity to histones H3 and H4, and it may participate in forming a nucleosome-like core in the TFIID complex.

Interactions 

TAF5 has been shown to interact with:
 TAF6, 
 TAF9,  and
 TAF15, 
 TATA binding protein.

References

Further reading

External links